Gedo is an administrative region in southwestern Somalia.

Gedo may also refer to:

 Gedo (film), a 2000 film
 Gedo Senki, an anime film by Studio Ghibli
 Gedo (wrestler) (Keiji Takayama), Japanese professional wrestler
 Gedo, a fictional high school in the film Battlefield Baseball
 Mohamed Nagy, Egyptian footballer nicknamed Gedo
 Mohamed Nagy (footballer, born 1996), Egyptian footballer nicknamed Gedo
 Gedō (band), a Japanese rock band